Cathedral of Saint Mary of the Assumption may refer to:

Italy 
 Cathedral of the Assumption of Mary (Lecce)
 Cathedral of the Assumption of Mary (Naples)
 Cathedral of the Assumption of Mary (Padua)
 Metropolitan Cathedral of Saint Mary of the Assumption, Siena
 Metropolitan Cathedral of Saint Mary of the Assumption and Saint Geminianus, Modena

United States 
 Cathedral of Saint Mary of the Assumption (San Francisco, California)
 Cathedral Basilica of the Assumption (Covington, Kentucky)
 Cathedral of the Assumption (Louisville, Kentucky)
 Cathedral of St. Mary of the Assumption (Fall River, Massachusetts)
 Cathedral of Mary of the Assumption (Saginaw, Michigan)
 Cathedral of St. Mary of the Assumption (Trenton, New Jersey)

Other countries 
 Cathedral of the Assumption, Gozo, Malta
 Cathedral of Saint Mary of the Assumption of Lucciana, Corsica, France
 Cathedral of the Assumption of Mary (Hildesheim), Germany
 Jakarta Cathedral (Cathedral of Our Lady of the Assumption), Indonesia
 St. Mary of the Assumption Cathedral (Chilpancingo), Mexico
 Archcathedral Basilica of the Assumption of the Blessed Virgin Mary and Saint Andrew in Frombork, Poland
 St Mary's Cathedral, Aberdeen (Cathedral Church of St Mary of the Assumption), Scotland
 Ceuta Cathedral (Cathedral Basilica of Our Lady of the Assumption), Spain
 Cathedral of Saint Mary of the Assumption (Chur), Switzerland
 Armenian Cathedral of the Assumption of Mary, Ukraine
 Our Lady of the Assumption Cathedral, Moncton, New Brunswick, Canada

See also
Cathedral of Saint Mary (disambiguation)
Assumption Cathedral (disambiguation)
 Church of Nuestra Señora de la Asunción (disambiguation)
 List of churches consecrated to Santa Maria Assunta